The Italian ambassador in Santo Domingo is the official representative of the Government in Rome to the Government of the Dominican Republic.
He is concurrently accredited in St. John's, Antigua and Barbuda (Antigua and Barbuda), Basseterre (St. Kitts and Nevis), Port-au-Prince (Haiti), and Kingston (Jamaica).

List of representatives 
<onlyinclude>

References 

 
Dominican Republic
Italy